Bomhoff is a surname. Notable people with the surname include:

Eduard Bomhoff (born 1944), Dutch economist and academic
Brede Bomhoff (born 1976), Norwegian footballer